Frances White (born 1 November 1938, Leeds) is an English actress, perhaps best known for her roles as Kate Hamilton in Crossroads and as Vera Flood in the BBC sitcom May to December.

A graduate of the Central School of Speech and Drama her TV appearances have included Juliet Bravo; Trevor's World of Sport; Dangerfield; Holby City; A Very Peculiar Practice; as Cassandra, prophetess of Troy, in the Doctor Who story The Myth Makers; as Julia, daughter of Augustus, Emperor of Rome, in I, Claudius; and as Queen Charlotte, wife of George III, in Prince Regent. Her film credits include roles in The Pumpkin Eater (1964), Press for Time (1966) and Mary, Queen of Scots (1971). She plays Granny Pig in the children's animated series Peppa Pig (2004–present).

White continues to act and do voice overs. As a voice-over artist she is represented by Rhubarb Voices.

Filmography

Series

References

External links

1938 births
Living people
English television actresses
20th-century English actresses
21st-century English actresses
Actresses from Leeds